Seven of Cups is a Minor Arcana tarot card of the suit of Cups.

Rider–Waite symbolism
Generally speaking, Waite describes these cups as strange chalices of vision. They are all up on a cloud, which may reflect their ungrounded, impractical or transient nature and the over-imagination or confusion of the figure conjuring them. Accordingly, they have been associated with wishful thinking.

There is some dispute as to what the 7 symbols in the cups mean, but tarotologists have some speculation as to the meanings. The exact elements of this vision may be less important than the very act of conjuring them. 

According to some, this Card represents self-delusion, while others emphasize choice or temptation. Under rare and extreme circumstances, it may indicate the revelation of transcendental spiritual truth(s).

The cups seem to offer:
 A human head – may represent a potential companion to the seeker (love); also, the face of an oracle that gives answers and wisdom to all enquiries.
 A shrouded, glowing figurine – may represent the burning need for the conjurer's self-illumination.
 A snake – may represent animal passion and desire. Alternatively, some consider the snake to represent powerful transformative knowledge. The snake around The Magician's waist may offer insight into Waite's intention with this inclusion herein.
 A castle or tower – may represent power and stability, or one's native land. (contrast with The Tower)
 A treasure hoard – probably represents wealth and abundance.
 A laurel wreath – most likely represents victory, honor and status. Note the skull like shadow on the cup itself, which may point to the great dangers of vanity and pride (a deadly sin).
 A dragon – in keeping with the Christian imagery of the deck, it is more likely a symbol of evil, anger and envy, calamity. Today, dragons are mostly associated with fantasy, the supernatural, magic.

Reversed
A period of clarity after a time of confusion. It can also indicate that long-held dreams or ambitions are being overturned, either for good or ill.

References

Suit of Cups